Jakob Altmaier (23 November 1889 in Flörsheim, Germany – 8 February 1963 in Bonn, West Germany) was a German journalist and a politician in the Social Democratic Party of Germany. He was one of few German Jews who returned to Germany after World War II and became active in politics.

Early life
During World War I, Altmaier volunteered for the Germany army  and was severely wounded.  In 1918, he participated in the German revolution that resulted in the establishment of the Weimar Republic.

From 1917 to 1919, he was the editor of the Frankfurt paper the Volksstimme, and throughout the 1920s he continued to work as a journalist for various papers, including the Manchester Guardian, and for the Social Democratic Press Agency.  As a foreign correspondent, he reported from Belgrade, Paris, and London.  With the rise of the Nazi party in 1933, he fled to Paris.  After the outbreak of war, he went to the Balkans, Spain, and finally to northern Africa, where was associated with British forces.  Until 1948, he was a correspondent for two social-democratic newspapers. 

Altmaier lost over 20 relatives during the Holocaust.

Political life
In 1949, Altmaier returned to Germany.  He was a member of the post-World War II Bundestag from its inception in 1949 until his death, as the Hanau representative. He was intimately involved with the 1952 reparation treaty between West Germany and Israel. Altmaier was also a member of the Parliamentary Assembly of the Council of Europe from 1950 until his death.

Honors
The Jakob-Altmaier street in Hanau as well as Altmaier street in Flörsheim am Main are named after Altmaier.  The city of Flörsheim  made him an honored citizen.

Further reading
Willy Albrecht: "Ein Wegbereiter: Jakob Altmaier und das Luxemburger Abkommen", in: Ludolf Herbst, Wiedergutmachung in der Bundesrepublik Deutschland, München 1989, pages 205–213.
Willy Albrecht: "Jeanette Wolff, Jakob Altmaier, Peter Blachstein. Die drei jüdischen Abgeordneten des Bundestags bis zum Beginn der sechziger Jahre", in: Julius H. Schoeps, Leben im Land der Täter, Berlin 2001, pages 236–253.
Werner Schiele: An der Front der Freiheit. Jakob Altmaiers Leben für die Demokratie, Magistrat der Stadt Flörsheim, 1991 
Peter Pirker: "Militantes Exil. Antideutscher Widerstand in Jugoslawien 1939–1940". In Zwischenwelt. Periodical of the Theodor Kramer Gesellschaft, Vol 27, No 4, February 2011 , pages 41–44.
Peter Pirker: Gegen das Dritte Reich! Sabotage und transnationaler Widerstand in Slowenien und Österreich 1938–1940. Kitab, Klagenfurt 2010 
Jay Howard Geller: Jews in Post-Holocaust Germany 1945–1953. Cambridge UP 2004

External links 
Altmaier collection at the Archive of the Social Democratic Party at the Friedrich-Ebert Foundation
Jakob Altmaier Collection at the Leo Baeck Institute, NY

References

1889 births
1963 deaths
20th-century German Jews
Jewish German politicians
Members of the Bundestag 1961–1965
Members of the Bundestag 1957–1961
Members of the Bundestag 1953–1957
Members of the Bundestag 1949–1953
Members of the Bundestag for Hesse
Members of the Bundestag for the Social Democratic Party of Germany